Coney Reyes on Camera was a weekly drama anthology that aired from May 19, 1984 to December 26, 1998 on RPN and ABS-CBN. It was the longest running drama anthology  of its time in Philippine TV history until Maalaala Mo Kaya broke the record in 2006. Coney Reyes was the host, lead star, actress and producer and it was replaced by Ang Munting Paraiso.

Overview
The drama anthology stars Reyes herself. Jaclyn Jose and Gina Alajar also played protagonist roles in some episodes.

Reyes had been working with major celebrities such as Vic Sotto, Vilma Santos, Helen Vela, Aiza Seguerra, German Moreno, Aga Muhlach, Sharon Cuneta, Rico Yan, Jolina Magdangal, Nora Aunor, and Judy Ann Santos, among others. Kris Aquino (daughter of the late former President Corazon Aquino), Imee Marcos (daughter of the late former President Ferdinand E. Marcos, Sr. and sister of the current President Bongbong Marcos), and Michelle van Eimeren (Miss Australia Universe 1994), also appeared on the show in separate episodes. One of the most unforgettable episodes was the reunion episode with Vilma Santos and Tina Revilla-Valencia in 1994 as a special tribute to the late Helen Vela.

The roots of Reyes' drama anthology was the Coney Reyes-Mumar Drama Studio, produced by Eddie Ilarde's Program Philippines and aired every Saturday on GMA Radio Television Arts after the hit noontime variety show Student Canteen (also produced by Program Philippines), where Reyes was a co-host. However, in 1982, Reyes moved to Student Canteen'''s rival show Eat Bulaga!, then airing on RPN. Drama Studio continued with former beauty queen Chat Silayan as its main star. Silayan, along with Chiqui Hollmann, also replaced Reyes on Canteen.

In 1984, Reyes was given a new drama anthology on RPN, originally entitled Coney Reyes-Mumar On The Set, premiering on May 19, 1984. It aired right after Eat Bulaga! on Saturdays, and was first produced by BSH Productions. She later took over production of the show when she put up CAN Television ("CAN" was derived from Reyes' real name, Constancia Angeline Nubla, under which she was credited as the show's producer). It was then retitled Coney Reyes On Camera (with the last name "Mumar" dropped after her estrangement with then-husband Larry Mumar).

After the sequestration of RPN on February 11, 1989 (which would later become CNN Philippines), the show, along with Eat Bulaga! and Agila (both produced by TAPE), moved to ABS-CBN. TAPE produced shows would remain on the network until January 22, 1995, even after Reyes left the production company in 1992.
After the transfer of TAPE shows to GMA Network, the show remained on ABS-CBN. Coney began to fully produce the show through the network's production unit, where it remained until its timeslot was temporarily replaced by Sports Unlimited and later, permanently replaced by Ang Munting Paraiso'', a weekly drama series also starring herself.

The show aired its final episode on December 26, 1998. It was reaired on ZOE TV Channel 11 (now Light TV 33 and A2Z) from 2002 to 2003.

References

ABS-CBN original programming
Radio Philippines Network original programming
Philippine anthology television series
1984 Philippine television series debuts
1998 Philippine television series endings
1980s Philippine television series
1990s Philippine television series
Filipino-language television shows
Television series by TAPE Inc.